Glycol ethers are a class of chemical compounds consisting of alkyl ethers that are based on glycols such as ethylene glycol or propylene glycol. They are commonly used as solvents in paints and cleaners. They have good solvent properties while having higher boiling points than the lower-molecular-weight ethers and alcohols. 

The name "Cellosolve" was registered in 1924 as a United States trademark by Carbide & Carbon Chemicals Corporation (a division
of  Union Carbide Corporation) for "Solvents for Gums, Resins, Cellulose Esters, and the Like". "Ethyl Cellosolve" or simply "Cellosolve" consists mainly of ethylene glycol monoethyl ether and was introduced as a lower-cost solvenet alternative to ethyl lactate. "Butyl Cellosolve" (ethylene glycol monobutyl ether) was introduced in 1928, and "Methyl Cellosolve" (ethylene glycol monomethyl ether) in 1929.

Glycol ethers are designated "E-series" for or "P-series" for those made from ethylene oxide or propylene oxide, respectively.  Typically, E-series glycol ethers are found in pharmaceuticals, sunscreens, cosmetics, inks, dyes and water-based paints, while P-series glycol ethers are used in degreasers, cleaners, aerosol paints and adhesives. Both E- and P-series glycol ethers can be used as intermediates that undergo further chemical reactions, producing glycol diethers and glycol ether acetates. P-series glycol ethers are marketed as having lower toxicity than the E-series. Most glycol ethers are water-soluble, biodegradable and only a few are considered toxic.

One study suggests that occupational exposure to glycol ethers is related to low motile sperm count, a finding disputed by the chemical industry.

Glycol ether solvents
 Ethylene glycol monomethyl ether (2-methoxyethanol, CH3OCH2CH2OH)
 Ethylene glycol monoethyl ether (2-ethoxyethanol, CH3CH2OCH2CH2OH)
 Ethylene glycol monopropyl ether (2-propoxyethanol, CH3CH2CH2OCH2CH2OH)
 Ethylene glycol monoisopropyl ether (2-isopropoxyethanol, (CH3)2CHOCH2CH2OH)
 Ethylene glycol monobutyl ether (2-butoxyethanol, CH3CH2CH2CH2OCH2CH2OH), a widely used solvent in paintings and surface coatings, cleaning products and inks
 Ethylene glycol monophenyl ether (2-phenoxyethanol, C6H5OCH2CH2OH)
 Ethylene glycol monobenzyl ether (2-benzyloxyethanol, C6H5CH2OCH2CH2OH)
 Propylene glycol methyl ether, (1-methoxy-2-propanol, CH3OCH2CH(OH)CH3)
 Diethylene glycol monomethyl ether (2-(2-methoxyethoxy)ethanol, methyl carbitol, CH3OCH2CH2OCH2CH2OH)
 Diethylene glycol monoethyl ether (2-(2-ethoxyethoxy)ethanol, carbitol cellosolve, CH3CH2OCH2CH2OCH2CH2OH)
 Diethylene glycol mono-n-butyl ether (2-(2-butoxyethoxy)ethanol, butyl carbitol, CH3CH2CH2CH2OCH2CH2OCH2CH2OH)
 Dipropyleneglycol methyl ether
 C12-15 pareth-12 a polyethylene glycol ether used as an emulsifier in cosmetics

Dialkyl ethers

 Ethylene glycol dimethyl ether (dimethoxyethane, CH3OCH2CH2OCH3), a higher boiling alternative to diethyl ether and THF, also used as a solvent for polysaccharides, a reagent in organometallic chemistry and in some electrolytes of lithium batteries
 Ethylene glycol diethyl ether (diethoxyethane, CH3CH2OCH2CH2OCH2CH3)
 Ethylene glycol dibutyl ether (dibutoxyethane, CH3CH2CH2CH2OCH2CH2OCH2CH2CH2CH3)

Esters

 Ethylene glycol methyl ether acetate (2-methoxyethyl acetate, CH3OCH2CH2OCOCH3)
 Ethylene glycol monoethyl ether acetate (2-ethoxyethyl acetate, CH3CH2OCH2CH2OCOCH3)
 Ethylene glycol monobutyl ether acetate (2-butoxyethyl acetate, CH3CH2CH2CH2OCH2CH2OCOCH3)
 Propylene glycol methyl ether acetate (1-methoxy-2-propanol acetate)

References

 
Commodity chemicals